Ekets GoIF is a Swedish football club located in Eket.

Background
Ekets GoIF currently plays in Division 4 Skåne Nordvästra which is the sixth tier of Swedish football. They play their home matches at the Ryavallen in Eket.

The club is affiliated to Skånes Fotbollförbund.

Season to season

Footnotes

External links
 

Sport in Skåne County
Football clubs in Skåne County
1943 establishments in Sweden

sv:Ekets GoIF